The Panther City Lacrosse Club is a box lacrosse team in the National Lacrosse League. They have played at Dickies Arena in Fort Worth, Texas since their inaugural 2021–2022 season.

History
On July 22, 2020, the NLL awarded an expansion franchise to the city of Fort Worth and owner Bill Cameron.  It was announced that the team would begin play in the 2021–2022 season, with its home arena being Dickies Arena.

The team branding was revealed on November 17, 2020, at a Dickies Arena press conference. The franchise officially became the Panther City Lacrosse Club, becoming the league's first member to use the "Lacrosse Club" moniker, similar to teams in the Premier Lacrosse League.

On January 25, 2021, former Philadelphia Wings assistant Tracey Kelusky was named the team's first head coach.

Inaugural season

Panther City debuted on December 4, 2021, against the Wings in Philadelphia. Travis Cornwall scored the first goal in franchise history as Panther City took a 1–0 lead. Despite leading 7–4 at halftime, the team could not start 1-0 as they fell to the Wings, 12–11 in overtime. A week later on December 10, the franchise played its first ever home game at Dickies Arena, where they fell to the Vancouver Warriors, 14–8 in front of 7,309 fans. After five games, Panther City got their first franchise win on January 15, 2022, on Long Island against the New York Riptide, 13-12 thanks to an overtime goal from rookie forward Patrick Dodds. It took a month and a half and four more tries, but Panther City notched their second win and first ever home win on February 26, 11–10, in a rematch with the Warriors in front of 4,714 fans. Again it would be Patrick Dodds providing late-game heroics with a goal with 39 seconds remaining. The next week, Panther City collected a consecutive win for the first time, and set a franchise record for goals scored with a 17–16 home overtime win over the Saskatchewan Rush.

The streak would eventually climb to five games, catapulting the team back to the playoff race with a 6-8 record. Panther City would hang in there until the penultimate week of the regular season when they lost to the Georgia Swarm. A home loss to Saskatchewan closed out the year, though Panther City still posted the best inaugural season record by an expansion team since the San Diego Seals in 2018-19.

Season-by-season record

Awards and honors

Draft history

NLL Entry Draft 
First Round Selections

 2021: Jonathan Donville (1st overall), Nathan Grenon (11th overall)
 2022: Jason Knox (5th overall), Mathieu Gautier (9th overall), Colton Lidstone (21st overall)

References

External links
 Official Website

2021 establishments in Texas
National Lacrosse League teams
 
Sports clubs established in 2021
Sports in Fort Worth, Texas